The Foreigner is a Norwegian online English-language newspaper, established in February 2009.

References

External links
The Foreigner website 
N.B: The Foreigner as a news, op-ed, features, columns, etc. source was closed in its then form in August 2017.
The domain and site were then taken over by a different owner and author(s) writing different content.

Newspapers published in Norway
European news websites
Newspapers established in 2009
2009 establishments in Norway